Aghuzchal (also Romanized as Āghūzchāl) is a village in Lat Leyl Rural District, Otaqvar District, Langarud County, Gilan Province, Iran. At the 2006 census, its population was 104, in 27 families.

References 

Populated places in Langarud County